Muzika na struju (trans. Electric Music) is the fifth studio album from Serbian and former Yugoslav rock band Bajaga i Instruktori, released in 1993.

The song "Marinina tema" was previously written for the theatre play Život Jovanov. The song "Golubica" featured Kristina Kovač, Aleksandra Kovač, Oktobar 1864 vocalist Tanja Jovićević, and Marija Mihajlović on backing vocals.

The songs "Gde si", "Ovo je Balkan", and "Golubica" featured political-related lyrics and anti-war message (as the album was released during the third year of the Yugoslav Wars). The song "Golubica" was based on the instrumental Bajagić played at Terazijska česma during the March 9, 1991 protest.

Track listing
All songs written by Momčilo Bajagić, except where noted.
"Muzika na struju" – 3:54
"Grad" – 3:47
"Gde si" – 4:06
"Grudi nosi k'o odlikovanja" – 3:23
"Mali svira gitaru" - 3:13
"Na grani" – 4:37
"Jedino to se zove ljubav" – 5:05
"Ovo je Balkan" – 3:02
"Marinina tema" – 3:53
"Lolita" – 4:34
"Nakostrešena mačka" (Ž. Milenković, M Bajagić) – 3:20
"Golubica" – 5:14

Personnel
Momčilo Bajagić - vocals, guitar
Žika Milenković - vocals
Miroslav Cvetković - bass guitar
Saša Lokner - keyboards
Nenad Stamatović - guitar
Vladimir Golubović - drums

Additional personnel
Kristina Kovač - backing vocals
Aleksandra Kovač - backing vocals
Tanja Jovićević - backing vocals
Marija Mihajlović - backing vocals

References 

Muzika na struju at Discogs
 EX YU ROCK enciklopedija 1960-2006,  Janjatović Petar;

External links 
Muzika na struju at Discogs

Bajaga i Instruktori albums
1993 albums